Revenge of the Fat People is an album by trumpeter Jack Walrath which was recorded in 1981 and released on the Stash label in 1982.

Reception

The AllMusic review by Scott Yanow stated "This Stash LP is a strong effort by the adventurous trumpeter Jack Walrath who contributed four of the six compositions. ... The music is as colorful and as adventurous its the titles".

Track listing
All compositions by Jack Walrath except where noted
 "Revenge of the Fat People" – 5:10
 "Duke Ellington's Sound of Love" (Charles Mingus) – 6:29
 "Beer!" – 8:10
 "Sliding Doors" (Michael Cochrane) – 7:58
 "Piggy Love" – 4:42
 "Blues in the Guts" – 6:38

Personnel
Jack Walrath – trumpet 
Ricky Ford – tenor saxophone
Michael Cochrane – piano
Cameron Brown – bass 
Mike Clark – drums

References

Stash Records albums
Jack Walrath albums
1982 albums